Mastro Guglielmo (eng. Master William) is the conventional name of an anonymous Italian master of Byzantine painting of the early 12th century and is associated with the crucifix kept and exhibited in the co-cathedral of Santa Maria Assunta in Sarzana on the coast of the Ligurian Sea.

Crucifix from Sarzana 

The crucifix from Sarzana by Mastro Guglielmo is a figure of the resurrected Christ painted in tempera on canvas, attached to a cross made of chestnut wood and is also the first known example of an iconography of the Christus triumphans typology. According to the interpretation of the Italian art historian Piero Torriti, the Jesus figure shown represents „an expanded grandeur, a strong search for life and freedom of movement that seems to dissolve the rigid oriental forms“.

One of the more famous copies of Mastro Guglielmo's crucifix can be found in the church of Heiligenkreuz Abbey, in the Lower Austrian municipality of the same name in the middle of the Vienna Woods: this was made by the Italian artist Renato Manfredi in 1980–1981 as part of the renovation of the altar area of the church and hung above the altar on Good Friday (17 April) in 1981.

References

External links
 
 Fondazione Carispezia: Una nuova Guida digitale per scoprire la preziosa Croce di Mastro Guglielmo (Italian)

12th-century Italian painters
Italian male painters
Romanesque artists
Byzantine painters